The 2010–11 Liga II was the 71st season of the second tier of the Romanian football league system. The season started on 28 August 2010 and ended on 4 June 2011.

FRF approved the new system with two divisions of 16 teams each, compared to the divisions of 18 teams used last season, thus coming back to the system that was used in the 1953 season, between the 1968–69 season and the 1972–73 season, in the 2001–02 season and in the 2002–03 season. At the end of the season, the top two teams of the series promoted to Liga I and the bottom three places from both series relegated to Liga III.

Team changes

To Liga II
Promoted from Liga III
 CF Brăila
 Viitorul Constanța
 Juventus București
 Alro Slatina
 ACU Arad
 Voința Sibiu

Relegated from Liga I
 Internațional Curtea de Argeș**
 Politehnica Iași**
 Ceahlăul Piatra Neamț
 Unirea Alba Iulia

From Liga II
Relegated to Liga III
 Baia Mare**
 FCM Bacău
 Fortuna Covaci
 Jiul Petroșani
 Râmnicu Sărat
 Drobeta-Turnu Severin
 Cetatea Suceava
 CFR Timișoara

Promoted to Liga I
 Victoria Brănești
 Târgu Mureș
 Sportul Studențesc
 Universitatea Cluj

Note (**)
Internațional Curtea de Argeș withdrew from Liga I at the end of the season and was relegated directly in the Liga IV. Mureșul Deva was spared from relegation.

FC Politehnica Iași (1945) was dissolved after relegation from Liga I. A successor team was founded by the merge of Navobi Iași and Tricolorul Breaza and enrolled directly in the second league, due to the vacant place left by Baia Mare. The new team was named ACSMU Politehnica Iași.

Săgeata Stejaru left its second league licence to the newly formed Săgeata Năvodari. The new entity was founded by the former owners of Săgeata Stejaru, team which was subsequently enrolled in the lower leagues.

Renamed teams
Dunărea Giurgiu signed a partnership with Liga I side Astra Ploiești and started to be its second squad. Dunărea Giurgiu was renamed as Astra II Giurgiu.

Dacia Mioveni ended its sponsorship contract with Automobile Dacia and was renamed as CS Mioveni.

Seria I

Stadia and locations

League table

Top scorers

Seria II

Stadia and locations

League table

Top scorers

Promotion play-off
At the end of the season, FRF decided that a promotion playoff round would be played between Săgeata Năvodari and Voința Sibiu, third and fourth respectively in each series, following the relegation of five teams from the 2010–11 Liga I. Winners of the promotion spot came Voința Sibiu after winning 2–0 on aggregate score.

|}

See also
 2010–11 Liga I
 2010–11 Liga III

References

Liga II seasons
Rom
2010–11 in Romanian football